Prof Alexander Robert Normand FRSE FRSGS (4 March 1880–18 July 1958) was a Scottish chemist and geologist.

Life
He was born in Edinburgh on 4 March 1880 the son of James Normand of Kirkton Lodge in Murrayfield. He was educated at the Royal High School, Edinburgh then studied chemistry at the University of Edinburgh, graduating with an MA BSc, followed by a PhD.

In 1934 he became Professor of Chemistry at Wilson College in Bombay. In the same year he was elected a Fellow of the Royal Society of Edinburgh. His proposers were James Pickering Kendall, John Edwin Mackenzie, Thomas Bolam and Ernest Bowman Ludlam.

He died at 33 Moray Place, Edinburgh on 18 July 1958.

Family

In 1909 he married Margaret Elizabeth Murray.

References

1880 births
1958 deaths
Scientists from Edinburgh
Alumni of the University of Edinburgh
Scottish chemists
Fellows of the Royal Society of Edinburgh
Scottish geologists
People educated at the Royal High School, Edinburgh
Academic staff of the University of Mumbai